Govind Lal is an Indian politician and member of the Bharatiya Janata Party. Lal was a member of the Uttarakhand Legislative Assembly from the Pindar constituency in Chamoli District.

References 

People from Chamoli district
Bharatiya Janata Party politicians from Uttarakhand
Members of the Uttarakhand Legislative Assembly
Living people
21st-century Indian politicians
Year of birth missing (living people)